Cuphodes melanostola is a moth of the family Gracillariidae. It is known from South Africa.

References

Cuphodes
Moths of Africa
Insects of Namibia
Moths described in 1918